The Mistri (or Mistry) are a Hindu caste found in state of Gujarat in India.

Castes known as Mistri

There are two different casts by the same name:-

1) Mistri, Mistri Gurjar - which are identified as Mistris, a community originally from Kutch.

2) Mistri-Suthar - which is another name of Suthar community of Gujarat.

Mistris

The Mistris ( also known as Kutch Gurjar Kshatriyas ) are a community of Kutch who migrated into Kutch in the early 7th Century from Rajasthan, to Saurashtra region of Gujarat. In the 12th Century they entered Kutch and established themselves at Dhaneti, later moving on to establish eighteen villages given to them by the then rulers of Kutch.

They are  a minority Hindu Gurjar Community of Gujarat and involved primarily in  the building of  forts, historical monuments, buildings of the Princely State of Cutch and railway lines and bridges.

Mistri Suthar

The Suthar community of Gujarat are also called as Mistris or Gurjar Mistri Suthar. They are a Hindu community belonging to the Vishwakarma group involved largely in carpentry works.

See also

 Mistri
 Mistry
 Mistry (surname)

References

Ethnic groups in India
Social groups of Gujarat
Tribes of Kutch
Indian castes
Social groups of India
Hindu communities